Radha Viswanathan (11 December 1934 – 2 January 2018) was an Indian vocalist and classical dancer. She performed extensively with her mother, Bharat Ratna Carnatic vocalist M. S. Subbulakshmi.

Early life and career 
Born on 11 December 1934 in Gobichettypalayam, she was the eldest daughter of Thiagarajan Sadasivam and his first wife, Apithakuchambal (alias Parvathi). However, she was brought up by M. S. Subbulakshmi whom her father married after the death of Apithakuchambal in 1938.

Radha had her early training in music from T. R. Balasubramaniam, Ramnad Krishnan and Mayavaram Krishna Iyer. She began accompanying M S Subbulakshmi on stage aged five. She combined this with intensive training in dance from Vazhavoor Ramiah Pillai (she was his first disciple along with Anandhi Ramachandran, daughter of Kalki Krishnamurthy) and made a reputation for herself as a Bharatanatyam dancer, making her arangetram (debut) in 1945. Radha and Anandhi would perform while M. S. sang Padams. Radha also performed an exclusive dance recital at the Carnatic Music College, Madras, for the violinist Yehudi Menuhin. She danced at Birla House before Mahatma Gandhi for a Meera Bhajan - "Ghanashyam Aayaari" with M.S. singing for her. At the age of 21, Radha gave up dancing to concentrate exclusively on singing. Radha was to soon become a vital force in MS concerts. M.S. and Radha jointly learnt Kritis from Musiri Subramania Iyer, Semmangudi Srinivasa Iyer and K. V. Narayanaswamy and Padams from T. Brinda. They also had intensive training in Hindustani classical music from Siddheshwari Devi of Benares and Dilipkumar Roy.

When she was six years old, Radha made her debut in films as Bharata in Shakunthala and as "Baby Meera" in Meera, which was directed by Ellis R. Dungan and produced by her father T. Sadasivam's company Chandraprabha Cinetones. In Meera she danced with Kumari Kamala who acted as Krishna. Meera was made in both Tamil and Hindi with the premiere of the latter version in 1947, being inaugurated by Prime Minister Jawaharlal Nehru himself. Lord and Lady Mountbatten, Rajendra Prasad, Vijaya Lakshmi Pandit and Indira Gandhi attended the premiere as well.

Radha accompanied M S Subbulakshmi on her frequent concert tours and recording engagements. M.S. had no disciples other than Radha. Both of them performed all over India and the world including the US, Europe, Japan, Singapore, Malaysia, Thailand and the Philippines. In 1966, they toured Europe and embarked on a coast to coast tour of the US, becoming some of the first vocalists of Carnatic music to perform in the US and Europe. During this tour, they performed a concert at the United Nations in October 1966. They sang a song composed specially for the occasion by the Paramacharya of Kanchi, "Maithreem Bhajatha".

The San Francisco Chronicle greeted their singing as "a series of miracles." The reviewer exclaimed: "Subbulakshmi’s elaborate vocal filigree sometimes sung in unison or octaves with her daughter Radha Viswanathan were unbelievable in their poised ease and constancy of flow..."

M.S. and Radha Viswanathan recorded many songs together. The "Venkateswara Suprabatham" and the "Vishnu Sahasranamam" were practiced for six months in front of Vedic scholars including Agnihotram Thathachariar and Swami Ranganathananda of Sri Ramakrishna Mutt. The Annamacharya recordings were released in 1980. They were a series of five records called the "Balaji Pancharatnamala" that included classical and devotional music. The royalties from these recordings were donated to various charities.

In 1975, when M.S. won the Ramon Magsaysay Award in the Philippines, both of them sang at the Malacañan Palace. In 1977 during their second tour of the US, they performed at Carnegie Hall. During Maha Shivaratri, they performed in front of the Paramcharya of Kanchi with just a tambura for accompaniment as he performed the pujas.

In 1982, at the Festival of India held in the United Kingdom, M.S & Radha performed at the Royal Albert Hall. This program was attended among others by Prince Charles, the Prime Minister of Great Britain, Margaret Thatcher, Indira Gandhi, Rajiv Gandhi, Sonia Gandhi, Ravi Shankar, V.K. Narayana Menon (Chairman of Sangeet Natak Akademi) and Zubin Mehta.

In April 1982 Radha fell critically ill with tuberculosis meningitis and slipped into a coma for three months. Although she survived, her recovery was slow. All of her concerts scheduled for the next year were cancelled by her father and no new ones were accepted.
Radha finally sang again on 12 March 1983 at M.S.'s benefit concert for the Houston Meenakshi Temple held at the Music Academy, Chennai.
For the next 10 years she accompanied M S Subbulakshmi for concerts, although the number was reduced, as age was catching up with M.S. and Thiagarajan Sadasivam. However, once again Radha's health deteriorated in 1992 and she had to completely stop accompanying M.S.

On 16 September 2007, Radha performed in concert for the first time in 15 years to celebrate M.S. Subbulakshmi's 91st birthday. Using a wheelchair, she was accompanied by her granddaughter Aishwarya. After this concert at Narada Gana Sabha, the pair sang together in more than 20 concerts, including some in the US. Radha was honoured with the title "Sangeetha Ratna" by Lalithakala Academy in March 2008. In April 2010 she was awarded the citation "Kala Chandrika" by the Cleveland Aradhana Committee for her outstanding services to the cause of Carnatic music. Radha's disciples are her Granddaughters S.Aishwarya and S.Saundarya who now carry forward the MS legacy, Anuradha (daughter of the K.V. Narayanaswamy), Sikkil Gurucharan (ref SG'S homepage), Mahesh Vinayakaram (son of the Ghatam Maestro – Vikku Vinayakram), Navaneet Krishnan, P.T Seshadri, Balaji Shankar (disciple of the late D K Jayaraman) and the playback singer Harini.

Personal life 
Radha was the wife of Guruswamy Viswanathan and has two sonsV Chandrasekhar and V Shrinivasan and one specially abled daughter Subbulakshmi Viswanathan. The eldest son Chandrasekhar is married to flautist Sikkil Mala, daughter of flautist Sikkil Neela. Their second son, Shrinivasan Viswanathan and his wife Geetha are parents of S. Aishwarya and S. Saundarya who are extremely popular musicians. Shrinivasan is the Managing Trustee of the "Suswaralakshmi Foundation for Classical Music and Performing Arts".

She died in Bangalore on 2 January 2018, aged 83.
Radha's daughter Subbulakshmi Viswanathan passed away on May 7, 2021, at Bengaluru due to Covid related complications. She was 50 years old.

References 

1934 births
2018 deaths
Women Carnatic singers
Carnatic singers
Indian women classical singers
20th-century Indian singers
People from Gobichettipalayam
20th-century Indian women singers
21st-century Indian women singers
21st-century Indian singers
Women musicians from Tamil Nadu